Decogmus is a genus of ground beetles in the family Carabidae. This genus has a single species, Decogmus chalybeus. It is found in Australia.

References

Migadopinae